Westerveld is a Dutch surname. Notable people with the surname include:

Bill Westerveld, New Zealand footballer
Jay Westerveld (born 1962), American environmentalist
Sander Westerveld (born 1974), Dutch footballer
Sem Westerveld (born 2002), Spanish-born Dutch footballer 

Dutch-language surnames